The Beretta APX is a family of polymer-framed, modular, striker-fired semi-automatic pistols designed and produced by Beretta. The series began in 2016, starting with the full-size standard model. The size of the line has grown, with the design branching off into law enforcement, concealed carry and competition-targeted models.

History
Designed largely for the U.S. Armed Forces' XM17 Modular Handgun System competition. Beretta had offered to provide their M9A3 model at a reduced price as a continuance of M9 procurement program, but were informed that the changes to the M9A3 were so significant that it fell outside the scope of an Engineering Change Proposal (ECP), and that the United States Department of Defense preferred to go through a new procurement instead.
Should the Beretta APX have won the MHS competition it would have been manufactured in the Beretta factory in Gallatin, Tennessee. Beretta maintains administrative offices at the location of the first factory in Accokeek, Maryland, but moved the factory due to the Maryland Legislation posture of unfriendliness to firearms makers, dealers, and owners.

On February 28, 2017, Beretta USA announced the APX availability for the US civilian market starting on April 15, 2017.

In 2018, three variants of the APX were announced: the APX Centurion, with a slightly smaller frame, slide and barrel, and the APX Compact, with a subcompact-sized frame, slide and barrel, and the APX Combat, with a threaded barrel and a mounting plate for optics on the slide.

In April 2019, Beretta introduced the APX Carry, a single stack magazine variant intended for the concealed carry market. The APX Carry is based on the Beretta Nano design with some features incorporated from the full sized APX. In July of that year, Beretta introduced three more designs, starting with flat dark earth variants of the Centurion and Compact models. The Centurion Combat was also introduced, which features a threaded barrel and mounting plate, just like the full sized APX Combat. Finally, the APX Target was introduced, which is a competition variant of the APX with a longer slide and barrel; these are fitted to each other at the factory to ensure greater accuracy. The slide also has a mounting plate for optics and the sights have been changed to a fiber-optic front sight and a blacked out rear sight. In addition to the changes to the slide and barrel, the frame also has no finger grooves to better suit the needs of competition shooters. The frame also features an extended magazine release and slide stop, as well as a green striker guide for a competition trigger. The APX Target trigger is half a pound (~2.2 N) lighter than a standard model and a shorter reset.

In May 2022, Beretta announced the APX A1, an ergonomically improved standard APX designed by Giovanni Prandini. The slide is red dot optic ready and features more aggressive slide serrations, alongside a newly designed frame with more aggressive stippling, a higher, undercut trigger guard, an enhanced beavertail and no finger grooves.

Design
The Beretta APX represents Beretta's first striker-fired duty-sized handgun. The name APX refers to "Advanced Pistol X" (the "X" referring to a caliber of choice), as the firearm is fully modular and can change calibers and frame sizes somewhat easily. In order to comply with the MHS specification, the firearms must support different grip sizes to fit shooters of different stature. The APX supports this with replaceable grip straps. As specified in the MHS specification, the APX also features a MIL-STD-1913 rail under the front of the frame.

Unlike other Beretta pistols, the APX uses the traditional Browning tilting-barrel short recoil design. The serialized part of the gun is a stainless steel chassis which allows true modular reconfiguration.  by allowing the factory black frame to be changed with a number of different options, including flat dark earth (FDE), tan, wolf grey and olive drab. Replacement frames are also available without finger grooves. The slide and barrel are coated in a black nitride finish, except for a newer FDE model that has a cerakote FDE slide and black nitride barrel.

Similar to Beretta's 92 and PX-series pistols, when the APX's trigger is pulled, the top of the striker block safety extends from the top of the pistol. This serves as a visual indicator to the user that this safety is working properly and has been disengaged. Unlike a number of striker-fired pistols, such as the Glock, which have to have the trigger pulled during take down, the APX has a striker deactivation button that can be pushed to deactivate the striker, thus preventing accidental discharge, which other striker-fired pistols can suffer due to user negligence during disassembly. There is also an automatic striker block safety.

The trigger mechanism features a drop safety. If the pistol is dropped, this prevents inertia from causing the trigger to fire the weapon, thus preventing accidental discharge.

Users 

: used by RENEA
 : Used by the National Public Security Force and regional police agencies. A total of 159,000 were purchased in 2020 for $69,000,000.
 : Municipal Police of Béziers use the 9mm Parabellum variant.
 : Used by Italian police
 : Purchased 4,600 pistols for the Poland National Police in 2019
 : Gallatin Police Department, Tennessee; Wetumpka Police Department, Alabama, Glendale Heights Police Department, Illinois

References

External links 
Beretta APX family - Beretta
Beretta APX - Beretta Defense Technologies

 Beretta firearms
Trial and research firearms of Italy
Semi-automatic pistols of Italy
9mm Parabellum semi-automatic pistols
9×21mm IMI semi-automatic pistols
.40 S&W semi-automatic pistols
Beretta pistols
Modular firearms
Weapons and ammunition introduced in 2016